Tanambao may mean several communes in Madagascar:
 Tanambao Marivorahona in Ambilobe District, Diana Region.
 Tanambao Daoud in Sambava District, Sava Region.
 Tanambao Besakay in Ambatondrazaka District, Alaotra-Mangoro Region.
 Tanambao Ambony in Atsimo-Andrefana region.
 Tanambao Tsirandrana in Androy Region.